Carlos Henrique França Freires, commonly known as França  is a Brazilian footballer who plays as a forward for Bulgarian First League club Lokomotiv Sofia.

Career
Having featured in 2018 Campeonato Brasileiro Série D for Cianorte, França was loaned to América Mineiro in June 2018, with a view to strengthening the club's Under 23 team in the Campeonato Brasileiro de Aspirantes. He made two appearances as substitute for the senior side in 2018 Campeonato Brasileiro Série A towards the end of the season, and earned himself another loan with América for 2019.

References

External links
 

Living people
1995 births
Brazilian footballers
Association football forwards
Comercial Futebol Clube (Ribeirão Preto) players
Esporte Clube Cruzeiro players
Cianorte Futebol Clube players
América Futebol Clube (MG) players
Campeonato Brasileiro Série A players
Campeonato Brasileiro Série B players
Campeonato Brasileiro Série D players
Footballers from Brasília